The Alaska Anchorage Seawolves are the 13 varsity athletic teams that represent the University of Alaska Anchorage (UAA), in Anchorage, Alaska, United States, in NCAA intercollegiate sports. The vast majority of UAA's athletic teams are in NCAA Division II, with the exception of the women's gymnastics and men's ice hockey teams, which are members of Division I.

The Seawolves principally compete as members of the Great Northwest Athletic Conference, fielding teams in women's volleyball, men's and women's basketball, men's and women's cross country, and men's and women's indoor and outdoor track & field. Teams playing outside the GNAC include the hockey team (independent, no conference affiliation), the gymnastics team (Mountain Pacific Sports Federation), and the ski teams (Rocky Mountain Intercollegiate Ski Association).

The nickname, Seawolves, is based on a Sea-Wolf, a mythical creature in Tlingit and Haida traditions.

Sports sponsored

References

External links